Trivial schools were schools in Sweden and its integrated part Finland from the early 17th century, in Sweden to 1905.

Trivial schools were the second grade of education in the 1649 school reform of Queen Christina. First grade was Pedagogium, followed by Trivial school and Gymnasium. Education in Trivial schools was given in three subjects; grammar including Latin and Greek, rhetoric and dialectic. The school lasted for eight years, having four two-year classes. They were disbanded in Grand Duchy of Finland by the 1843 school reform and in Sweden in 1905.

Trivial schools in Sweden 
Eksjö
Falun
Frösön
Gothenburg
Gävle
Hudiksvall
Härnosand
Jönköping
Kalmar
Karlshamn
Katedralskolan, Uppsala
Klara skola, Stockholm
Kristianstad
Kungälv
Linköping
Maria trivialskola, Stockholm
Nicolai skola, Stockholm
Nyköping
Piteå
Skara
Skänninge
Strängnäs
Sundsvall
Söderköping
Umeå
Visby
Visingsö
Västervik
Västerås
Växjö
Ystad
Örebro

Trivial schools in Finland 
Helsinki
Hämeenlinna
Kuopio
Oulu
Pori
Rauma
Turku
Vaasa
Vyborg

References 

School types
Education in Sweden
Education in Finland
Social history of Sweden
Social history of Finland
1649 establishments in Sweden
1905 disestablishments in Sweden